Joan of Arc is a 1915 bronze equestrian statue on a granite base, sculpted by Anna Hyatt Huntington. The statue is located in Manhattan, New York City, on Riverside Drive and 93rd Street. It depicts the Roman Catholic saint and French folk heroine Joan of Arc.

Description and history
Huntington's Joan of Arc stands at the intersection of Riverside Drive and 93rd Street in Manhattan.  Copies were installed in San Francisco, Blois, Gloucester, Massachusetts, and Quebec City.  Cast in bronze by the Gorham Manufacturing Company to one-and-a-half-times life size, its Mohegan granite base was designed by John Vredenburgh Van Pelt; it contains fragments of the Rouen cell Joan was imprisoned in before her execution, and from Reims Cathedral.   Jean Jules Jusserand spoke at its dedication on December 6, 1915.   The $35,000 ($ in ) needed to erect the statue was donated by numismatist J. Sanford Saltus, namesake of the American Numismatic Society's Saltus Award.   Huntington was catapulted into the international spotlight after the statue was unveiled with such dignitaries as Mina Edison, Thomas Edison's second wife.  

In 1919 the New York Camera Club held a competition on who could take the best photo of the statue.  The top four entrants had their pictures published in the November 16, 1919, New-York Tribune.

Awards

The plaster model, which she made at the studio of Jules Dalou, earned her Honorable Mention at the 1910 Paris Salon. 
One of the works of art credited to the City Beautiful movement. 
Earned Anna Hyatt Huntington the Legion of Honor.

See also
 1915 in art
 Cultural depictions of Joan of Arc
 Equestrian statue of Joan of Arc (Portland, Oregon)

References

Bibliography

 - Total pages: 128 
 
 - Total pages: 128

External links

 

1915 establishments in New York City
Bronze sculptures in Manhattan
Equestrian statues in New York City
Granite sculptures in New York City
Middle Ages in popular culture
Monuments and memorials in New York City
Outdoor sculptures in Manhattan
Sculptures by Anna Hyatt Huntington
Sculptures of women in New York City
Works about Joan of Arc